William Faircloth (born August 8, 1942) is a former American college football player and coach. He served as the head football coach at Catawba College in Salisbury, North Carolina from 1973 to 1975, compiling a record of 14–15–1.

Head coaching record

References

External links
 Deacon Club profile

1942 births
Living people
American football offensive linemen
Catawba Indians football coaches
Duke Blue Devils football coaches
Wake Forest Demon Deacons football coaches
Wake Forest Demon Deacons football players